Alexander Dyukov may refer to:

Alexander Reshideovich Dyukov (born 1978), Russian historian and journalist
Alexander Valeryevich Dyukov, (born 1967), chairman of Gazprom and president of Russian Premier League team Zenit St. Petersburg